A Real Live Dead One is a live album  by English heavy metal band Iron Maiden, released in 1998. The album tracks were recorded at different venues across Europe during the Fear of the Dark Tour in 1992 and the Real Live Tour in 1993.

Released in 1998 alongside the band's entire remastered discography, this album is a compilation of A Real Live One and A Real Dead One, which were both previously issued individually in 1993.

Track listing

Credits
Production and performance credits are adapted from the album liner notes.
Iron Maiden
 Bruce Dickinson – vocals
 Dave Murray – guitar
 Steve Harris – bass guitar, producer, mixing
 Nicko McBrain – drums
 Janick Gers – guitar
Additional musicians
 Michael Kenney – keyboards
Production
 Mick McKenna – engineer
 Tim Young – mastering
Derek Riggs – cover illustration
Guido Karp – photography
George Chin – photography
Tony Mottram – photography
Hugh Gilmour – reissue design
Rod Smallwood – management
Andy Taylor – management

References

Iron Maiden compilation albums
Iron Maiden live albums
1998 live albums
EMI Records live albums
Live heavy metal albums